Whip It Out is the second studio album by Australian band Jo Jo Zep & The Falcons. It was released on 25 November 1977, by Oz Records. The album peaked at number 98 on the Australian Kent Music Report.

Track listing

Charts

References 

1977 albums
Jo Jo Zep & The Falcons albums